Midland railway station is the terminus of the Midland line in Perth. Western Australia. It is operated by Transperth and is connected with the feeder bus services that utilise the adjacent bus terminal in Midland.

History
Midland station was opened on 8 October 1968 by Minister for Transport & Railways Ray O'Connor as a replacement for Midland Junction station when the main Eastern Railway was being converted to dual gauge.

It originally had four narrow gauge platform faces, three terminating and one through. A separate platform was provided for the standard gauge line 150 metres away. One of the terminating lines was lifted in the 1990s and in February 2001, the through line converted to dual gauge allowing The Prospector to call at the main station.

Redevelopment
In the 2010s the former Midland Redevelopment Authority (MRA) had advocated the relocation of the station east to be in line with Cale Street, the site of the original Midland Junction station. The MRA also desired an extension of the Midland line to Bellevue, which would take on a primarily park and ride function, to allow for land around Midland station to be redeveloped. There have been previous attempts to extend the line to Bellevue.

As part of Metronet, Midland Station will be demolished and replaced with a new station located between Helena and Cale streets. The relocation of the station was required to accommodate the extension to Bellevue, where a new railcar manufacturing facility is located. A multi-storey car park with over 600 bays and a 12 stand bus interchange will be built at the location of the current station. As part of the project, the level crossing at Helena Street will close and will be replaced with a new crossing at Cale Street.

Platforms and services

The station has a single through standard gauge side platform served by Transwa's AvonLink, MerredinLink and Prospector services, and Journey Beyond's Indian Pacific and two narrow gauge bay platforms used by Transperth Midland line services.

The station saw 1,125,120 Transperth passengers in the 2013-14 financial year.

Bus routes

References

External links

 New Midland Station website page.

Midland, Western Australia
Midland line, Perth
Railway stations in Perth, Western Australia
Railway stations in Australia opened in 1968
Bus stations in Perth, Western Australia